Quercus albicaulis is a rare Chinese species of trees in the beech family. It has been found only on the Island of Hainan in southern China.

Quercus albicaulis is a large tree up to 30 m tall with white twigs and leaves as much as 18 cm long.

It is placed in subgenus Cerris, section Cyclobalanopsis.

References

External links
line drawing, Flora of China Illustrations vol. 4, fig. 392, 10-12 

albicaulis
Trees of China
Plants described in 1958